Nebraska Highway 94 is a highway in northeastern Nebraska.  It has a western terminus at an intersection with Nebraska Highway 9 and Nebraska Highway 16 in Pender.  Its eastern terminus is at U.S. Highway 75 to the northwest of Macy.

Route description
Nebraska Highway 94 begins in Pender at an intersection with NE 9 and NE 16.  The highway heads in an eastward direction through farmland, before turning to the northeast as it enters Walthill.  Just outside the eastern edge of Walthill, NE 94 intersects US 77 as it resumes its eastward orientation.  The highway terminates a few miles further along at US 75 northwest of Macy.

Major intersections

References

External links

Nebraska Roads: NE 81-100

094
Transportation in Thurston County, Nebraska